Hawthorn Lake is a  lake located on Vancouver Island east of Nahmint Bay.

See also
List of lakes of British Columbia

References

Alberni Valley
Lakes of Vancouver Island
Barclay Land District